William Guy Dible (5 November 1861 – 15 August 1894) was an English first-class cricketer. Dible was a right-handed batsman who bowled right-arm fast.

Career

Greenfield made his first-class debut for Surrey against the touring Australians in 1882. This was the only first-class appearance Dible made for Surrey.

In 1883 Dible made his first-class debut Hampshire against Sussex. On debut Dible claimed his maiden five-wicket haul with figures of 5/69. Later in the 1883 season in Hampshire's second match against Sussex, Dible took ten wickets in the match with 4/16 in Sussex's first innings and 6/50 in their second.

In 1884 Dible represented Hampshire in eight first-class matches, where he took 34 wickets at a bowling average of 22.61, including figures of 5/65 against Surrey. In addition Dible scored his maiden and only first-class half century, a score of 68 against Sussex.

The 1885 season would turn out to be Hampshire's last season with first-class status until the 1895 County Championship, nonetheless Dible played eleven first-class matches for the county during that season, with his final first-class match coming against Kent. In Dible's 25 first-class matches for Hampshire, he scored 495 runs at a batting average of 13.37 and a high score of 68. With the ball Dible took 90 wickets at a bowling average of 22.12, with five five-wicket hauls and best figures of 7/60. Dible took ten wickets in a match once.

Despite Hampshire losing their first-class status, Dible continued to represent the county in non first-class matches until 1890, with his final appearance for Hampshire coming against Staffordshire.

Death

Dible died at Fareham, Hampshire on 15 August 1894.

External links
William Dible at Cricinfo
William Dible at CricketArchive
Matches and detailed statistics for William Dible

1861 births
1894 deaths
Cricketers from Southampton
English cricketers
Surrey cricketers
Hampshire cricketers